Atmakur mandal is one of the 38 mandals in Nellore district of the Indian state of Andhra Pradesh. Its headquarters are located at Atmakur. The mandal is located at Atmakur revenue division.

Demographics 

 census, the mandal had a population of 1,50,333. The total population constitute, 75,206 males and 75,127 females —a sex ratio of 999 females per 1000 males. 8,365 children are in the age group of 0–6 years, of which 4,276 are boys and 4,089 are girls —a ratio of 999 per 1000. The average literacy rate stands at 70.98% with 95,515 literates.

Towns and villages 

 census, the mandal has 16 settlements. It includes 1 town and 15 villages.  is the most populated and Anagunta is the least populated villages in the mandal.

The settlements in the mandal are listed below:

See also 
List of mandals in Andhra Pradesh

References

Mandals in Nellore district